Natalia Russkikh is a former Tajikistani-Russian football defender, who played for Zorky Krasnogorsk in the Russian Championship. A former player of Lada Togliatti, she has won the Championship and played the UEFA Champions League with both teams.

She first played for the Russian national team in the 2011 World Cup qualifiers.

References

1985 births
Living people
Russian women's footballers
People from Sughd Region
Russia women's international footballers
FC Lada Togliatti (women) players
WFC Rossiyanka players
Women's association football defenders
FC Zorky Krasnogorsk (women) players